Rosa Maria Correia dos Santos Mota, GCIH, GCM (born 29 June 1958) is a Portuguese former marathon runner, one of her country's foremost athletes, being the first sportswoman from Portugal to win Olympic gold. Mota was the first woman to win multiple Olympic marathon medals as well as being the only woman to be the reigning European, World, and Olympic champion at the same time. On the 30th Anniversary Gala of the Association of International Marathons and Distance Races (AIMS) she was distinguished as the greatest female marathon runner of all time.

Biography
Born in Porto's downtown neighbourhood of Foz Velha, Rosa started participating in cross-country races  while in high school.

In 1980 she met José Pedrosa, the man who would eventually be her personal trainer for her entire career. Rosa Mota's first marathon was at the European Championships of 1982, hosted by Athens, Greece - the first Women's Marathon ever. Mota was not one of the favourites for gold, but she easily beat Ingrid Kristiansen to win her first marathon.

This success was typical of Rosa Mota's career, as she usually finished well in the prestigious marathons. She was awarded the bronze medal in the first Women's Olympic Marathon in the Los Angeles Olympic Games. Her personal best time was 2:23:29 in the 1985 Chicago Marathon. Mota won the Chicago Marathon twice.

European Champion in 1986, and World Champion in Rome, 1987, she kept on winning with the Olympic gold medal in Seoul 1988, where with 2 km left in the race, she attacked, winning by 13 seconds from silver medalist Lisa Martin.

In 1990, she returned to Boston to win for a third time beating Uta Pippig. After that she attempted to defend her European Marathon Championship in Split. She ran from the front and had a lead of over 1.5 minutes at the half way mark, but she was caught at the 35 km mark by Valentina Yegorova. They battled to the finish and Mota won by a slim margin of 5 seconds. As of 2006, winning a third European Championships marathon was unprecedented for both men and women. She won the 1991 Lisbon Half Marathon

Despite all her success Rosa Mota was suffering from sciatica and asthma as a child, yet, in 1991, she continued winning, this time the London Marathon. Later that year, Mota had to abandon the Tokyo World championships and she finally considered retirement after failing to finish the 1992 London Marathon.

Mota ran 21 marathon races between 1982 and 1992. She averaged two marathons a year for a decade and won 14 of those races.

Achievements

After retirement 

Considered an Ambassador of Sport, in 1998 she won the Abebe Bikila Award for contributions to the development of long-distance race training. The trophy was awarded at the end of the International Race for Friendship, sponsored by the United Nations, taking place in the morning before the 1998 New York City Marathon.

Rosa Mota was one of the most popular personalities of Portuguese sport in the late 20th century, alongside Eusébio, Carlos Lopes and Luís Figo.

Rosa Mota carried the Olympic flame along the roads of Athens before the 2004 Summer Olympics in Greece.

References 

1958 births
Living people
Sportspeople from Porto
Portuguese female long-distance runners
Portuguese female marathon runners
Olympic athletes of Portugal
Olympic gold medalists for Portugal
Olympic bronze medalists for Portugal
Olympic gold medalists in athletics (track and field)
Olympic bronze medalists in athletics (track and field)
Athletes (track and field) at the 1984 Summer Olympics
Athletes (track and field) at the 1988 Summer Olympics
Medalists at the 1984 Summer Olympics
Medalists at the 1988 Summer Olympics
World Athletics Championships athletes for Portugal
World Athletics Championships medalists
European Athletics Championships medalists
Boston Marathon female winners
Chicago Marathon female winners
London Marathon female winners
World Athletics Championships winners